Tharwat Abaza (28 June 1927 – 17 March 2002) was an Egyptian journalist and novelist. His best-known novel, A Man Escaping from Time, was turned into an Egyptian television series in the late 1960s, and A Taste of Fear, a short story which was turned into an Egyptian film in the late 1960s. A journalist for Al Arabi newspaper was sentenced to prison for six months due to alleged defamation to Abaza. He died at the age of 74 in 2002.

References

External links
 Egyptian Figures: Tharwat Abaza (1927-2002)

1927 births
2002 deaths
Journalists from Cairo
Egyptian newspaper journalists 
Egyptian novelists
Egyptian prisoners and detainees
Arabic-language novelists 
20th-century novelists
20th-century journalists